Sergey Lisunov (born October 12, 1986) is a Russian professional water polo player. He is currently playing for WPC Dynamo Moscow. He is 6 ft 6 in (1.98 m) tall and weighs 251 lb (114 kg).

Family 

He is married to the water polo player Ekaterina Lisunova, they have a son.

References

External links

 Sergey Lisunov on Instagram
 Sergey Lisunov on Facebook
 Sergey Lisunov on web.archive.org
 Капитану сборной России жена подарит второго ребенка
 vk.com

1986 births
Living people
Russian male water polo players
Sportspeople from Volgograd